Presidential elections were held in Liberia in 1855. The result was a victory for Vice-President Stephen Allen Benson, who defeated the incumbent Joseph Jenkins Roberts. Benson took office as the country's second president on 7 January 1856.

References

Liberia
1855 in Liberia
Elections in Liberia
May 1855 events
Election and referendum articles with incomplete results